The Theseus was the Bristol Aeroplane Company's first attempt at a gas-turbine engine design.  A turboprop delivering just over 2,000 hp (1,500 kW) was chosen rather than compete with companies that were already developing turbojets. A heat exchanger to transfer waste heat from the exhaust to the compressor exit was necessary to meet a requirement for a fuel consumption comparable to a piston engine. The heat exchanger was abandoned after tests showed it had a high pressure loss and saved much less fuel than had been expected.

As well as being one of the first engines to feature a free propeller turbine, the Theseus was the first turboprop in the world to pass a type test in January 1947. Following 156 hours of ground runs and the receipt of a test certificate from the Ministry of Supply on 28 January 1947, two Theseus engines were fitted in the outer positions of a four-engined Avro Lincoln for air tests. After ground and taxying test the Lincoln first flew on 17 February 1947.

The engine was also installed in two Handley Page Hermes 5 development aircraft.

It was soon superseded by the Proteus design with more power.

Applications
Avro Theseus Lincoln
Handley Page Hermes 5

Bristol Theseus on public display
East Midlands Aeropark Castle Donington.

Variants
Theseus Series TH.11
Variant without heat exchanger
Theseus Series TH.21
Variant with heat exchanger
Theseus 502

Specifications (Theseus Th.21)

See also
List of aircraft engines

References

Notes

Bibliography

Gunston, Bill. World Encyclopedia of Aero Engines. Cambridge, England. Patrick Stephens Limited, 1989.

External links

"Bristol Theseus I" a 1945 Flight article
Development of the turboprop Flight   30 November 1950

1940s turboprop engines
Theseus
Mixed-compressor gas turbines